Patricia, "Patty" Loew is a journalist, professor, author, and community historian, broadcaster, documentary film maker, academic and advocate. She has written extensively about Ojibwe treaty rights, sovereignty and the role of Native American media in communicating Indigenous world views.

Early life 
Patty Loew grew up in the north side of Milwaukee, Wisconsin. Her grandfather, Edward DeNomie, a World War I veteran, lived for many years with her family.

Education 
Loew pursued her BA in Mass Communications at University of Wisconsin La Crosse (1974). She later completed her Master's and PhD in Mass Communications at the University of Wisconsin Madison in 1992 and 1998 respectively.

Career 
Loew began her career as a journalist in La Crosse, beginning with television and radio reporting. She later moved to Madison Wisconsin where she eventually worked her way to the anchor's desk at ABC affiliate WKOW-TV. She covered environmental issues and became a popular local news personality. When fishing rights for tribes in Wisconsin surfaced in the 1980s, Loew became a prominent journalist covering the issue.

In the 1990s, Loew returned to university to pursue graduate studies. She was later hired as a professor in 1999 and has published award-winning books and textbooks. She also engaged in public scholarship, co-hosting a Wisconsin Public Television program "Weekend" and produced documentaries focused on Indigenous history and culture. She is currently Professor at the Medill School of Journalism at Northwestern University and is director of the Center for Native American and Indigenous Research.

Loew has led Tribal Youth Media initiative since 2006, which fosters digital storytelling skills within the next generation of Indigenous youth. Loew has served on the board of UNITY: Journalists for Diversity. In 2019 she was inducted into the American Academy of Arts and Sciences and received Wisconsin's Martin Luther King Jr. Heritage Award.

Selected scholarship and publications

Books

Documentary films 

 Sacred Stick (2013)
Protect Our Future (2013-2014)
Naanan Nimiseyug (My Five Sisters) (2012)
After The Storm (2010)
 Way of the Warrior (2007)
 Great Lakes Legacy (2007)
 Home Away from Home (1996)
The Spring of Discontent (1990)
 Fishing for Answers : How to Reduce the Contaminants in Sport Fish (1989)
 On Wisconsin (1988)
 No Word for Goodbye (1986)

Journal articles 

 Loew, Patty, “A Digital Gift to the Seventh Generation,” Yukhika-latuhse: She Tells Us Stories, Oneida Nation Native Journal, Fall 2013.
 
 Tynan, Tim and Loew, Patty “Organic Video Approach: Using New Media to Engage Native Youth in Science," American Indian Culture and Research Journal, Volume 34, Number 4 (winter 2010)
 
 Loew, Patty, “Tinker to Evers to Chief: Baseball From Indian Country, Wisconsin Magazine of History, Vol. 87, Number 3 (spring 2004).
 Loew, Patty, “Back of the Homefront: Oral Histories of Native American and African-American Wisconsin Women During World War Two,” Wisconsin Magazine of History, Vol 82, Number 2 (winter 1998–99).

Awards and honours 

 American Academy of Arts and Sciences (2019)
 Wisconsin Martin Luther King Jr. Heritage Award (2019)
 Distinguished Alumni Award, University of Wisconsin La Crosse (2011)
 Outstanding Woman of Color, University Wisconsin Madison (2009-2010)
 Midwest Book Award for Culture (2014)
Honorary Doctorate, Edgewood College (2003)
Honorary Doctorate, Northland College (2003)
 Wisconsin Library Association Outstanding Book Award (2002)

References 

1952 births
Living people
Native American academics
Native American journalists
Native American filmmakers
University of Wisconsin–La Crosse alumni
21st-century Native American women
21st-century Native Americans
20th-century Native American women
20th-century Native Americans
American women journalists
American women documentary filmmakers
Academics from Wisconsin
American women academics
Journalists from Wisconsin